The women's heptathlon at the 2002 European Athletics Championships were held at the Olympic Stadium on August 9–10.

Results

External links
Results

Heptathlon
Combined events at the European Athletics Championships
2002 in women's athletics